Robert Coles (born 2 September 1972) is an English professional golfer who currently plays on the European Tour.

Coles was born in Hornchurch, England. He turned professional in 1994.

Coles has won three times on the Challenge Tour, once at the 2003 BA-CA Golf Open (Austrian Open) and twice in 2009, at the Moroccan Classic by Banque Populaire and the Challenge of Ireland. The Austrian Open at the time was a Challenge Tour event, but has since become a European Tour event. He has finished on the top 100 on the European Tour Order of Merit three times, in 2004, 2005 and 2011. He lost his card in 2006 and returned to the Challenge Tour. He returned to the European Tour in 2010. He has amassed over one million euros in career earnings. In February 2011, Coles finished runner-up at the Avantha Masters to Shiv Chawrasia. The pair were tied going into the par-five 18th, however Coles made bogey allowing Chawrasia to take the tournament with a par.

Professional wins (4)

Challenge Tour wins (3)

Challenge Tour playoff record (2–2)

Other wins (1)
2017 PGA Play-offs

Results in major championships

CUT = missed the halfway cut
Note: Coles only played in The Open Championship.

Team appearances
Professional
PGA Cup (representing Great Britain and Ireland): 2017 (winners), 2019

See also
2009 Challenge Tour graduates

External links

English male golfers
European Tour golfers
People from Hornchurch
1972 births
Living people